KMLS is a traditional country music formatted broadcast radio station.  The station is licensed to Miles, Texas and serves San Angelo in Texas.  KMLS is owned and operated by Miriam Media, Inc.

References

External links

2015 establishments in Texas
Classic country radio stations in the United States
Radio stations established in 2015
MLS